Miska was a Palestinian village, located fifteen kilometers southwest of Tulkarm, depopulated in 1948.

History
Miska was founded by descendants of the Arabian tribe of Miskain during the 7th century Islamic conquest of Palestine.

According to the Arab geographer Yaqut, writing in the 1220s, Miska was known for its fruit, especially the misk (musk) apple variety which was said to have been transferred to Egypt by the Fatimid vizier Abu Muhammad al-Yazuri, who died in 1058.

Ottoman era
The French commander Jean Baptiste Kléber and his troops passed by the village on their way to Napoleon's siege of Acre in 1799.   Pierre Jacotin named  the village Meski on his map from the same campaign.

In 1870, Victor Guérin visited and estimated that the  population of Miskeh was 300. He further noted that "In the court of the medhafeh (guest-house) I saw a column and a marble chapter, apparently of Byzantine work. Round the houses are gardens, planted principally with fig-trees, among which here and there rise palms."

In 1882, the PEF's Survey of Western Palestine (SWP) described Miska an adobe village of small size, with olives to the north and south, and a well to the south.

British Mandate era
In the 1922 census of Palestine conducted by the British Mandate authorities, Meskeh had a population of 443;  all  Muslims, increasing in  the 1931 census to 635, still all Muslim, in a total of  123 houses.

In the  1945 statistics the population of Miska  and Sde Warburg was 880 Arabs and 180 Jews, while the total land area was 8,076 dunams, according to an official land and population survey.  Of this, Arabs used 1,115 dunams for citrus and bananas, 304 dunams for plantations and irrigable land, 3,245 for cereals, while 88 dunams were classified as built-up areas.

1948 and after
On 15 April 1948, Miska's Arab inhabitants were expelled on the order of the Haganah, the primary Jewish force prior to the outbreak of the 1948 Arab–Israeli War. The village, with the exception of a boy's elementary school and a mosque, was destroyed on the orders of Yosef Weitz, a Jewish National Fund official.

On 16 June 1948, David Ben-Gurion, almost certainly based on a progress report from Yosef Weitz, noted Miska as one of the Palestinian villages that they had destroyed.

Sde Warburg was established in 1938 on land that traditionally belonged to the village. Mishmeret was established in 1946, to the northwest of the village site, on village land. Ramat HaKovesh, founded 1932, is about 1 km due west of the village site, though not on village land.

The Palestinian historian Walid Khalidi described the village in 1992: "The site is covered with citrus groves; cactuses grow along the perimeter of these groves. The two-room school still stands and is used as housing for the watchmen who guard the orchards. The mosque serves as a storehouse for bales of hay and agricultural tools. The large cement fragments of a demolished enclosure built around the village well are visible. Most of the surrounding land has been planted by Israelis with citrus trees."

The school buildings were destroyed by order of the Israel Land Administration in 2006 following commemoration activities at the site organised by Palestinian Citizens of Israel and Israeli NGO Zochrot.

See also
Depopulated Palestinian locations in Israel

References

Bibliography

External links
Welcome to Miska
Miska, Zochrot
Survey of Western Palestine, Map 10:    IAA, Wikimedia commons
Miska from the Khalil Sakakini Cultural Center
Miska by Rami Nashashibi (1996), Center for Research and Documentation of Palestinian Society.
, by Eitan Reich and Adi Kemmelgren
, 2002
, 2003, by Ido Tzvieli
, 2005 in Miske
, July 20, 2005.
, by Yosefa Mekaitun,

, 2006
, destroyed July 2006
, 2006
, April 24, 2007

Arab villages depopulated prior to the 1948 Arab–Israeli War
District of Tulkarm